Kosinsky District (Köslador rajon) is an administrative district (raion) of Komi-Permyak Okrug of Perm Krai, Russia; one of the thirty-three in the krai. Municipally, it is incorporated as Kosinsky Municipal District. It is located in the northwest of the krai. Its administrative center is the rural locality (a selo) of Kosa. Population:  The population of Kosa accounts for 32.9% of the district's total population.

Geography
The Kosa River (a tributary of the Kama) flows through the district.

History
The district was established on February 23, 1924.

Demographics
Ethnic composition (as of the 2002 Census):
Komi-Permyak people: 71.7%
Russians: 25.7%

References

Notes

Sources

Districts of Perm Krai
Komi-Permyak Okrug
States and territories established in 1924